The 2023 Brown Bears football team will represent Brown University as a member of the Ivy League during the 2023 NCAA Division I FCS football season. They will be led by fourth-year head coach James Perry and play its home games at Richard Gouse Field at Brown Stadium.

Previous season

The Bears finished the 2022 season with an overall record of 3–7 and a mark of 1–6 in conference play to place last in the Ivy League.

Schedule

References

Brown
Brown Bears football seasons
Brown Bears football